Perry Richardson Bass (November 11, 1914 – June 1, 2006) was an American heir, investor, philanthropist and sailor.

Early life
Perry Richardson Bass was born on November 11, 1914, in Wichita Falls, Texas. He was educated at The Hill School in Pottstown, Pennsylvania. He graduated from Yale University in New Haven, Connecticut with a Bachelor of Science degree in Geology in 1937.

Career
He worked for his uncle, Sid W. Richardson, a rancher and oil wildcatter, in the 1940s and 1950s. Upon his uncle's death, he inherited his oil and ranching interests, worth several million dollars.

Philanthropy
As a result of good investments, Bass was worth US$1 billion by 2005 and was the 746th-wealthiest American citizen. He  became a philanthropist. He funded the Nancy Lee and Perry R. Bass Performance Hall in Fort Worth, Texas. In 1991, he donated US$1 million to 50 institutions. The Perry R. Bass Marine Fisheries Research Center in Palacios, Texas is named in his honor.

With his wife, he has donated art to the Kimbell Art Museum in Fort Worth. The collection includes Street in Saintes-Maries-de-la-Mer and Enclosed Field with Plowman by Vincent van Gogh as well as Fruit Dish, Bottle, and Guitar by Pablo Picasso. It also includes paintings by Claude Monet, Camille Pissarro, Pierre-Auguste Renoir, Édouard Vuillard, Pierre Bonnard, Henri Matisse, Joan Miró, Fernand Léger, Marc Chagall and Mark Rothko as well as sculptures by Auguste Rodin, Aristide Maillol and Simon Segal.

He was a leading syndicate member of the unsuccessful 1974 America’s Cup defender candidate, Mariner, helmed by Ted Turner.

Sailor
Perry built his own wooden Snipe sailboat; in 1935, while studying at Yale, he won the Snipe class world sailing championship. A one-time Vice Commodore of the Houston Yacht Club and a proud longtime member of the Del Rey Yacht Club, he was honorary navigator for Ted Turner's "American Eagle" when it won the Southern Ocean Racing Circuit and the Sydney to Hobart Yacht Race in 1972.

Personal life
He married Nancy Lee Muse in 1941. They had four sons, all notable businessmen and philanthropists, and all billionaires: Sid Bass (born 1942), Ed Bass (born 1945), Robert Bass (born 1948) and Lee Bass (born 1956)

Death
He died on June 1, 2006, in Fort Worth, Texas.

References

1914 births
2006 deaths
People from Wichita Falls, Texas
People from Fort Worth, Texas
The Hill School alumni
Yale College alumni
American investors
Philanthropists from Texas
American art collectors
American billionaires
Bass family
Snipe class world champions
American male sailors (sport)
World champions in sailing for the United States